A hamdog is an Australian sandwich that consists of a shaped bread bun with a beef patty cut in two, and a frankfurter placed in between the two halves which is then topped off with cheese, pickles, sauces, tomato, lettuce and onion.

History
Australian Mark Murray conceived one kind of hamdog in 2004. His version contains a beef patty cut in two, with a frankfurter placed in between the two patties, then topped off with cheese, pickles, sauces, tomato, lettuce and onion. He received a US design patent for the specially shaped bun in 2009.

Another variety of hamdog was invented in February 2005 by Chandler Goff, the owner of a bar in Decatur, Georgia. This version consists of a hot dog wrapped in a half pound of hamburger with bacon, cheese and onion on a hoagie bun which is deep-fried and served with a fried egg on top and a side of French fries. He started selling it at the Indiana State Fair in 2006. A hamdog eating contest was established in Vadnais Heights, Minnesota, in 2007 by Jimmy's Food and Drink. There is no reward for the winner other than bragging rights. Dr. Nicholas Lang, professor of surgery at the University of Arkansas for Medical Sciences, advised against consuming a hamdog, even as a one-time snack.

See also

 Hot dog variations
 List of hamburgers
 List of hot dogs
 List of regional dishes of the United States
 List of sandwiches
 Southern cuisine

References

Hamburgers (food)
Hot dogs
Australian cuisine
Food and drink introduced in 2003